Prince Sadruddin Aga Khan (1933 –  2003) was a statesman and activist who served as United Nations High Commissioner for Refugees from 1966 to 1977, during which he reoriented the agency's focus beyond Europe and prepared it for an explosion of complex refugee issues. He was also a proponent of greater collaboration between non-governmental organizations (NGOs) and UN agencies. The Prince's interest in ecological issues led him to establish the Bellerive Foundation in the late 1970s, and he was a knowledgeable and respected collector of Islamic art.

Born in Paris, France, he was the son of Sir Sultan Mahomed Shah Aga Khan and Princess Andrée Aga Khan. He married twice, but had no children of his own. Prince Sadruddin died of cancer at the age of 70, and was buried in Switzerland.

Life and career

Childhood and education
Born in Neuilly-sur-Seine, France, he was the only child of Sir Sultan Mahomed Shah Aga Khan III and his  French-born third wife, the former Andrée Joséphine Carron. He received his early education in Lausanne, Switzerland, before graduating Phi Beta Kappa in 1954 from Harvard College. At Harvard, he lived in Eliot House with Paul Matisse, grandson of French artist Henri Matisse, with future Paris Review founders George Plimpton and John Train, and with Stephen Joyce, grandson of Irish writer James Joyce. Along with Plimpton, he was an editor for the Harvard Lampoon. After three years of post-graduate research at the Harvard Center for Middle Eastern Studies, Prince Sadruddin began a lifelong career of international service.

Although he was raised in Europe by his French mother, his father, who was the 48th hereditary Imam of the Nizari Ismaili Muslims, had a strong influence on him. He recalled that his father "insisted that I learnt the Koran and encouraged me to understand the basic traditions and beliefs of Islam but without imposing any particular views. He was an overwhelming personality but open-minded and liberal."

Together with his father Prince Sadruddin traveled widely in Muslim countries, coming into contact with his Islamic roots from a young age. He described Iran as the cradle of his family, though he never lived there. When he was a child, his paternal grandmother used to recite to him the great epic poems of Persian history. He held British, French, Iranian, and Swiss citizenship, and was fluent in French, English, German and Italian, while also speaking some Persian and Arabic.

UNESCO
Prince Sadruddin joined the United Nations Educational, Scientific and Cultural Organization (UNESCO) in 1958, and became the Executive Secretary to its International Action Committee for the Preservation of Nubia in 1961. This initiative brought together archaeologists from Eastern Europe and the West at the height of the Cold War. The construction of the Aswan Dam threatened ancient Egyptian treasures including Abu Simbel, the temples of Philae and Kalabsha, and the Christian churches of Nubia. He would later describe it as "one of UNESCO's great achievements" because of the challenging historical context in which it took place—in particular the ongoing tensions in the Middle East and the Cold War.

UN High Commissioner for Refugees
Prince Sadruddin began as a Special Envoy to the United Nations High Commissioner for Refugees (UNHCR) in 1959 with a focus on World Refugee Year (1959–1960). The initiative became known for its Stamp Plan, a philatelic programme that raised funds through United Nations member countries, as well as the support of the Universal Postal Union. At the time, the UNHCR's resources were primarily focused on supporting refugees crossing from Eastern Europe.

In January 1966, Prince Sadruddin was appointed United Nations High Commissioner for Refugees after serving for three years as Deputy High Commissioner. At the age of 33 he became the youngest person ever to lead the UNHCR. For the next twelve years he directed the UN refugee agency through one of its most difficult periods, coordinating the international response to the 1971 Bangladesh crisis that uprooted  people, the 1972 exodus of hundreds of thousands of Hutus from Burundi to Tanzania, and the Vietnamese boat people tragedy of the mid-1970s. In 1972, Prince Sadruddin played a key role in finding new homes for tens of thousands of South Asians expelled from Uganda by Idi Amin.

Prince Sadruddin's determination not to discriminate between European and Third World refugees helped prepare the UNHCR for a change in the landscape of internationally displaced persons. During the 1950s, between 200,000 and 300,000 refugees of European origin required assistance. By the 1970s the European refugee problems were mostly solved, but had been replaced by millions of displaced persons in the Third World. He had widened the UNHCR mandate well beyond its original focus on Eastern Europe, extending the organisation's reach to refugees from Palestine, Vietnam, Angola and Algeria. As the scale and complexity of refugee issues continued to increase, the UNHCR and the international community at large was better positioned to adapt. By the end of 1977 when he chose to step down from the position, he had become the longest-serving UN High Commissioner for Refugees. He continued to serve in various capacities dealing with humanitarian situations on behalf of the UN.

United Nations diplomatic career
Prince Sadruddin had, since 1978, been variously: Special Consultant and Chargé de Mission to the Secretary-General of the United Nations, Special Rapporteur of the UN Human Rights Commission and Convenor and Co-Chairman of the Independent Commission on International Humanitarian Issues and of the Independent Working Group on the UN Financial Emergency. He was later Coordinator for United Nations Humanitarian and Economic Assistance Programmes Relating to the People of Afghanistan and Executive Delegate of the Secretary-General for a United Nations Inter-Agency Humanitarian Programme, which dealt with problems of Iraq's border areas.

His appointment in September 1990 as Personal Representative of the UN Secretary-General for Humanitarian Assistance Relating to the Crisis between Iraq and Kuwait required diplomatic finesse. Iraq's President Saddam Hussein was deeply suspicious of the UN, and was loath to do anything that would benefit the country's Shia Muslims. Despite this, Prince Sadruddin was able to successfully negotiate with Foreign Minister Tariq Aziz for the establishment of a UN relief program for tens of thousands of Shia Muslims trapped in worsening conditions in the marshlands of southern Iraq.

Prince Sadruddin was nominated and passed over twice for the post of UN Secretary-General. Although he won the 1981 vote, the Soviet Union considered him too Western and vetoed his election. When he was nominated again in 1991, the United States and Britain expressed their disagreement with his belief in a policy of boosting aid to Iraq.

Environmental protection and advocacy
In 1977, Prince Sadruddin, together with Denis de Rougemont and a few other friends, established a Geneva-based think-tank, Groupe de Bellerive (named after Bellerive, the municipality where he lived in Geneva), and a non-profit organisation, the Bellerive Foundation. The foundation collaborated with international institutions, British and Scandinavian bilateral aid organizations, and other NGOs such as the World Wide Fund for Nature (WWF). It became a leading grassroots action group promoting environmental protection, natural resource conservation and the safeguarding of life in all its forms.

Initially, Bellerive worked with UNICEF and the United Nations Children's Fund in the struggle against deforestation. Prince Sadruddin was motivated in part by what he called "ecological refugees", who were forced to leave regions that could no longer sustain them due to desertification and other environmental changes. The foundation worked with Swiss specialists to develop low-cost, energy-efficient cooking stoves that relied on renewable energy sources such as methane and biogas. It distributed these among needy rural populations, primarily in Africa. Other areas of concern for Bellerive included the proliferation of nuclear weapons, and the protection of threatened species.

As a resident of Switzerland, Prince Sadruddin was concerned about the impact of insensitive tourist development and deforestation on the European Alps. At the World Economic Forum in 1990, he launched Alp Action to protect the mountain ecosystem and preserve the Alps' cultural diversity and vitality. The Bellerive Foundation program encouraged eco-tourism, aiming to reduce the impact of outdoor adventure sports on the fragile alpine habitat. During its years of operation, Alp Action successfully launched over 140 projects in seven countries. It found inspiration in the system of national parks of the Canadian Rockies.

A long-standing trustee and former Vice-President of the World Wide Fund for Nature International, Prince Sadruddin led Bellerive's support for threatened species. Bellerive was also amongst the first organisations to warn of the potential human health hazards of modern intensive farming methods.

In May 2006, the activities of the Bellerive Foundation were merged into the Geneva-based Aga Khan Foundation (founded in 1967 by Prince Sadruddin's nephew Karim Aga Khan IV) to form the Prince Sadruddin Aga Khan Fund for the Environment. The US$10 million fund is dedicated to finding practical solutions to environmental problems. The fund concentrates its activities in six areas that were important to Prince Sadruddin: environmental education; natural resource management in fragile zones; nature parks and wildlife reserves; environmentally and culturally appropriate tourism infrastructure; environmental health; and research.

Death and remembrance
Prince Sadruddin died of cancer in Boston, Massachusetts, on  2003, coincidentally, the same day as his elder half-brother Prince Aly Khan had died 43 years earlier. His body was conveyed to Switzerland, where members of the diplomatic corps, government officials and close friends were invited to pay their last respects at the Château de Bellerive, and sign books of condolence at various locations around the world. Ruud Lubbers, then UNHCR High Commissioner, expressed the sadness of the UNHCR and the entire humanitarian community, commenting that "he left an indelible print on UNHCR's history—leading the agency through some of the most challenging moments. Sadruddin's name became synonymous with UNHCR."

In accordance with his wishes, Prince Sadruddin's burial took place at a private ceremony attended by members of his family. Traditional Muslim ceremonies were led by Sheikh Ahmed Ahmed Ibrahim, who leads the prayers at the mausoleum of the Prince's father, Aga Khan III, in Aswan, Egypt. Last respects were paid beneath the arches of the Château de Bellerive, before the bier was carried to the local cemetery of Collonge-Bellerive. A tribute from the Canton of Geneva read: "The destiny of this family of high Persian nobility, descended from the Prophet Muhammad, is inextricably linked to that of this small European town and to an ambitious project to improve the human condition."

The United Nations community celebrated Prince Sadruddin's life at a memorial ceremony held in his honour at its headquarters in New York on  2003. He was remembered for representing the moral and compassionate side of the international community. Then United Nations Secretary-General Kofi Annan commented that "he combined respect for humankind with concern for our environment. He worked on behalf of the poor and dispossessed, while celebrating humanity through culture and art."  He concluded his tribute by praising Prince Sadruddin as "a role model to many of us ... his example will continue to inspire new world citizens for several generations to come."

He was survived by his wife of 31 years, Princess Catherine; his three stepsons Alexandre, Marc and Nicolas; as well as his nephews and niece Prince Karim, Prince Amyn and Princess Yasmin; and his cousin Mme. Francoise Carron. It was Prince Sadruddin's and Princess Catherine's wish that their remains be buried in Egypt.

Personal life
Prince Sadruddin's life was deeply influenced by his family roots and cultural heritage. Prince Sadruddin's grandmother was the granddaughter of the Qajar Emperor Fath'Ali Shah.

International service was a family tradition, and throughout his life Prince Sadruddin was surrounded by it. His father held influential roles in British India.  He also served two terms as President of the League of Nations. Prince Sadruddin's older half-brother, Prince Aly Khan, was Pakistan's Ambassador to the United Nations. Prince Karim Aga Khan IV, the 49th Imam of the Ismaili Muslims and present Aga Khan, was a nephew to Prince Sadruddin, and is the founder and Chairman of the Aga Khan Development Network. His brother, Prince Amyn, had previously worked with the United Nations before joining the Aga Khan's secretariat. Meanwhile, Prince Sadruddin's niece Princess Yasmin, has devoted herself to the fight against Alzheimer's disease.

Prince Sadruddin had a taste for culture, including music, art and literature. He was a familiar figure at music festivals and other cultural events, both in Europe and overseas. His concern for the environment was complemented by his enjoyment of the outdoors; he was a keen skier and an accomplished sailor. While still at Harvard in 1953, Prince Sadruddin became the founding publisher of the Paris Review, which was established with the aim of bringing original creative work to the fore. Every year the Review awards the Aga Khan Prize for Fiction (established by his father) for the best short story that it published in the past year.

Marriages
On 27 August 1957, in Bellerive, Switzerland, Prince Sadruddin married Nina Dyer (1930–1965). An Anglo-Indian fashion model, she was the former wife of Baron Hans Heinrich Thyssen-Bornemisza. She converted to Islam, taking the name "Shirin" (lit. "sweetness"). They had no children and divorced in 1962. Dyer committed suicide in 1965.

He married Catherine Aleya Beriketti Sursock on November 25, 1972 in the British West Indies. Born in Alexandria, she was the former wife of Lebanese aristocrat Cyril Sursock (son of Nicolas Sursock and Donna Vittoria Serra of the Dukes di Cassano). She and Prince Sadruddin had no children, but from this marriage he gained three stepchildren: Alexandre Sursock (married to Thai Princess Mom Rajawongse Charuvan Rangsit Prayurasakdi), Marc Sursock, and Nicolas Sursock.

Art collection
During his lifetime Prince Sadruddin assembled one of the finest private collections of Islamic art in the world. He became a knowledgeable and respected collector, accumulating a priceless collection of paintings, drawings, manuscripts and miniatures over 50 years. He had also gathered a collection of primitive and African art which he sold sometime prior to 1985.

Prince Sadruddin's interest in Islamic art was sparked in his youth by his paternal grandmother's library of Persian books, mystical texts and astrological treatises. While at Harvard in the 1950s, he would make purchases in New York, and eventually began to acquire from dealers in Paris, Geneva and London. He would bid regularly at Sotheby's and Christie's auctions in Europe and North America. For advice, he looked to his friend Stuart Cary Welch, a noted historian of Islamic art at Harvard University.

His collection is vast and diverse, and includes Arabic, Persian, Turkish, and Indian pieces dating from the 10th century. One example is a Quranic page of North African origin written with gold lettering in the Kufic script – it is more than 1,000 years old. Prince Sadruddin's Persian roots are well represented in calligraphic as well as pictorial specimens reflecting a range of periods and dynastic patrons. Also included are several examples of Ottoman callgraphies, manuscripts and paintings.

Over the years, parts of his collection were exhibited in New York, London, and Zurich, including a touring show, "Princes, Poets and Paladins", which was organized by the British Museum in 1998. The full collection is housed at the Aga Khan Museum in Toronto, established by Prince Sadruddin's nephew, the present Aga Khan.

Awards and decorations
Prince Sadruddin received several honorary doctorates and national decorations from states as diverse as Pakistan, Poland and the Vatican, as well as the United Nations Human Rights Award. He was elected a Foreign Honorary Member of the American Academy of Arts and Sciences in 1991. He was awarded the Bourgeois d'Honneur de Geneve, made a Commandeur of the Légion d'honneur of France and a Knight Commander of the Order of St. Sylvester (KCSS) of the Holy See, and was a recipient of the Order of the Nile of Egypt. Furthermore, he was made a Knight Commander of the Order of the British Empire (KBE), this for his services to humanitarian causes and the arts. He was an honorary citizen of Patmos, Greece, where he owned a house.

References

External links

|-

1933 births
2003 deaths
Qajar dynasty
Harvard College alumni
The Harvard Lampoon alumni
Aga Khan Development Network
Honorary Knights Commander of the Order of the British Empire
French Ismailis
Deaths from cancer in Massachusetts
United Nations High Commissioners for Refugees
French humanitarians
French expatriates in the United States
Commandeurs of the Légion d'honneur
Knights of the Order of St. Sylvester
Fellows of the American Academy of Arts and Sciences
French people of Iranian descent
French officials of the United Nations
Noorani family